Sporting Club Saint-Laurent Treize are a French Rugby league club based in Saint-Laurent-de-la-Cabrerisse, in the region of Pyrenees-Orientales. Founded in 2011 they play in the French National Division 2 Languedoc-Rousillon Regional League. Home games are played at the Stade de la Gare

History 
Sporting Club Saint-Laurent Treize were founded in 2011 by local businessmen and current chairmen Christian Bensen and Jerome Desnarnaud. In just their second season they won the Coupe Falcou and the Aude Cup and reached the National Division 2 play-offs. The following season brought yet more success when they retained the Coupe Falcou and once again reached the league play-offs.

Honours 
 Coupe Falcou (2): 2013, 2014

See also 
National Division 2

External links 
 Site

References 

French rugby league teams
2011 establishments in France
Rugby clubs established in 2011